NSB El 1 is the first electric locomotive series used by the Norwegian State Railways, from 1922 until 1973. Twenty-four engines were delivered from ASEA and Thune, twenty-two in 1922 and two in 1930. Based on the German DB E 71 and Swedish SJ Oc it has two two-axle bogies with one motor in each.

History

When the Drammen Line from Oslo West Station to Brakerøya was electrified as the first NSB line in 1922, NSB was in need of electric traction. The engines were used both for passenger- and freight trains. At first it was used on the Drammen Line, then on Sørlandet Line. In 1966 two of the locos, no. 2001 and 2002, were sold to the Rjukan Line where they served until 1988. Two of the locomotives have been preserved (no. 2001 and 2011).

El 01
ASEA locomotives
15 kV AC locomotives
Rjukan Line
Electric locomotives of Norway
Railway locomotives introduced in 1922
Norsk Transport locomotives
Standard gauge locomotives of Norway